Muhsin Ertuğral (born 15 September 1959) is a UEFA Pro Licensed Turkish football manager. He works as Turkish National Team Technical Advisor for the Turkish Football Association (TFF).

Playing career
Ertuğral played for Antalyaspor before leaving his homeland and continuing his career at clubs in Belgium and Germany where he also honed his coaching craft.

Coaching career

After coaching the DR Congo national team Ertuğral took over Kaizer Chiefs in 1999. Ertuğral took Ajax Cape Town to ABSA Cup glory with a 2–0 victory against league champions Mamelodi Sundowns on 26 May 2007. That proved to be a successful season for Ajax under Ertuğral as they went on to finish fourth in the league and the only side never to suffer defeat against Sundowns in that season.

On 8 May 2009, he quit Kaizer Chiefs.

On 18 May 2009, Ertuğral signed for Ajax Cape Town.

As of 8 October 2009, upon Bülent Uygun's resignation, he agreed to pen a deal with the Turkish Super League underdogs Sivasspor, the contract runs between 30 June 2011. Yiğidos also announced that the assistant coach position would be occupied by former Beşiktaş favorite and South Africa national team player Fani Madida.

On 24 April 2013, it was announced that Ertuğral would take over as the new Technical Director of Ajax Cape Town. This decision resulted in the direct resignation of then interim coach Jan Versleijen, who had not been notified of the new hiring. As a result, Ertuğral would see the Cape club through until the end of the 2012–13 Premier Soccer League season. David Nyathi was announced as his assistant coach, who had previously led the Ajax CT under-19 team to the 2013 Metropolitan Premier Cup Championship, where he won the “Coach of the Tournament Award”.

References

External links 
 
 Muhsin Ertuğral manager profile at Mackolik.com 
 

1959 births
Living people
Turkish footballers
Association football defenders
Eskişehirspor footballers
Turkish football managers
Lamontville Golden Arrows F.C. managers
Sivasspor managers
Ajax Cape Town F.C. managers
Ismaily SC managers
SV Mattersburg managers
Kaizer Chiefs F.C. managers
Democratic Republic of the Congo national football team managers
Expatriate football managers in the Democratic Republic of the Congo
Expatriate soccer managers in South Africa
Turkish expatriate sportspeople in the Democratic Republic of the Congo
Turkish expatriate sportspeople in Egypt
Footballers from Istanbul
Club Africain football managers
Turkish expatriate football managers
Süper Lig managers
Orlando Pirates F.C. managers
1996 African Cup of Nations managers
Expatriate football managers in Austria
Expatriate football managers in Egypt